Xylocopa alticola is a species of carpenter bee native to Africa.

The species was described by Hans Hedicke in 1938.

The Smithsonian has specimens collected from Mount Kilimanjaro in Tanzania.

References

alticola
Hymenoptera of Africa
Insects of Tanzania
Insects described in 1938